Pavel Samiec (born 1984) is a Czech composer and accordionist.

Education and professional career

2000-2006 he studied the accordion at Pilsen Conservatory under Ludmila Rottenbornova and later at West-Bohemian University (ZČU) under Jarmila Vlachova. 2006-2012 he studied composition under Jiri Bezdek.

As an accordionist he took part of many national and international competitions and is a winner of the International Accordion Competition in Reinach, Switzerland (2003).

His compositions have been performed on various international music festivals (Kleine Tage für Harmonika Klingenthal, Beethovenův Hradec,...).

List of works composed by Pavel Samiec

Chamber music

 Kontemplace (2005) — organ passacaglia
 String quartet (2005–2006)
 Preludium and fuga (2006) — organ, dedicated to Veronika Husinecka
 Variace na vlastní nálady (2007) — piano
 Sonata per violoncello e piano (2007)
 Osvity (2008) — for piano, violin and cello, inspired by poetry of Daniel Soukup
 Zátiší (2008) — for accordion, violin and cello
 Kašperská Nokturna (2009) — flute quartet
 Fantasie for violin and accordion "Našeptávač" (2009), dedicated to Jakub Jedlinsky and Iva Kramperova
 Vzpomínky dvorního šaška (2009) — children suite per accordion
 Sonatina GABRETA for flute and piano
 Sonata da chiesa for accordion
 “Bouře” — fantasia for accordion
 Sentence for Violin and Piano (2010) - dedicated to Marek Pavelec and Jan Simandl
 Fragments of the time (2015) - piano quintet
 "HORETISAI - surrealistic vision for piano" (2011) - dedicated to Jiří Pešek
 Piano Sonata No.1 (2016) - dedicated to Věřa Müllerová
 Sonata No. 2 for accordion (2013)
 Sonata No. 3 for accordion "Buffa"
 Casus Icari (2012) - fantasy for accordion- dedicated to J. Vlachová
 Children suite for accordion No.3 "Winter" (2016)
 Children suite for accordion No.4 "Populaire" (2017)

Songs

 Mlhy a deště (2006–2007) — alt and piano, lyrics by Ch. Baudelaire
 Básníkův povzdech (2008) — tenor and piano
 Nesnadné léto (2008) — alt, piano and accordion, lyrics by Jan Skacel
 Když po poli chodí smuténka... (2011) - soprano and piano, lyrics by Jan Skacel

Orchestral

 De profundis clamavi (2005) — String orchestra, choir and solo soprano
 Concerto for accordion and orchestra (2008–2009) - dedicated to Radek Dlouhy 
 Dies sanctificatus (2009 – 2010)
 Úslava (2014) - symphonic poem
 Canción del amor y Danza de la muerte (2011)- orchestral fantasy - dedicated to Orquesta Sinfónica Chamartín (Madrid)
 Firework music (2012)
 Sketches for accordion and symphony orchestra (2013) - dedicated to Marcela Matějková
 Oratorio k Panně Marii Klatovské (2014 - 2015)

References

Czech accordionists
Czech composers
Czech male composers
Living people
1984 births
University of West Bohemia alumni
21st-century accordionists
21st-century Czech male musicians